Bharatiya Janata Party, Uttarakhand or BJP Uttarakhand is a state unit of the Bharatiya Janata Party (BJP) in Uttarakhand.

Mahendra Bhatt is the current president of BJP Uttarakhand.

Electoral History

Legislative Assembly election

Lok Sabha election

Leadership

Chief Minister

President

See also
 Bharatiya Janata Party, Gujarat
 Bharatiya Janata Party, Uttar Pradesh
 Bharatiya Janata Party, Madhya Pradesh
 State units of the Bharatiya Janata Party 
 Bharatiya Janata Party
 National Executive of the Bharatiya Janata Party
 State units of the Bharatiya Janata Party
 Uttarakhand Pradesh Congress Committee
 Uttarakhand Kranti Dal

References

External links
 Bharatiya Janata Party, Uttarakhand official website

Bharatiya Janata Party
Political parties in Uttarakhand
Uttarakhand